Baggonal Mohra is a village in the Islamabad Capital Territory of Pakistan. It is located at 33° 22' 5N 73° 21' 35E with an altitude of 455 metres (1496 feet).

References 

Union councils of Islamabad Capital Territory
Villages in Islamabad Capital Territory